Ravazd is a village in Győr-Moson-Sopron county, Hungary.

King Ladislaus I donated it to the Benedictine Abbey of Pannonhalma. During the Ottoman invasion, the Cseszneky family also had noble estates in the village. The Turks destroyed the village, but in the 18th century, it was re-populated by Hungarian serfs.

Ravazd is famous for the fountain of King Béla IV.

Famous residents
 Gyula Peidl (1873 – 1943), Hungarian trade union leader, politician, Prime Minister and head of state of Hungary

External links 
 Street map 

Populated places in Győr-Moson-Sopron County